Alicia Hill was launched in 1807 in France under another name. She was taken in prize and entered British ownership in 1811. In 1812 a French privateer captured her, but the Royal Navy quickly recaptured her. She primarily traded with the Mediterranean. Still, pirates plundered her off the coast of Sierra Leone. She was wrecked at Odessa in the Black Sea in November 1820.

Career
Alicia Hill, Redmayne, master, arrived on 4 June 1810 at Liverpool. She had come from Guadeloupe, suggesting that she may have been captured a few months after the invasion of Guadeloupe (1810) in January-February. Whether she was a prize from that campaign or had been taken earlier and elsewhere in the Caribbean is an open question.

Alicia Hill first appeared in Lloyd's Register (LR) in the issue for 1811.

Aigle was the former Weymouth to Guernsey packet . Aigle, of 61 men under the command of Captain Alexander Black, had thrown eight of her 14 guns overboard while trying to escape Sybille. Aigle was three days out of Bennodet, near Quimper, and had earlier captured the brig Alicia as Alicia was sailing from Bristol to Gibraltar. Aigle arrived at Cork on 15 July.

Alicia Hill, P.LeBrun, master, arrived at Liverpool on 28 November 1812 from Malalga. She was carrying a cargo of raisins, almonds, reeds, and jars of grapes.

A letter from Sierra Leone dated 27 January 1818 reported that Alicia Hill, of Liverpool, had arrived at Freetown from the leeward part of the coast. She had encountered a brig and a schooner that had plundered her of all her outward bound cargo, her spare sails, cordage, wearing apparel, and about a ton of ivory. The brig was reportedly armed with fourteen 24-pounder cannons, and the schooner with one long gun amidships. It took the pirates two days to complete their plundering. Alicia Hill had been on her way to Liverpool from Sierra Leone. On 26 April, Alicia Hill, Crawford, master, was at Cork; on 1 May she arrived at Liverpool. She had a cargo of oil, hides, wax, elephants teeth (ivory tusks), gum copal, and camwood.

She next returned from Pará, Brazil with cotton, rice, and fustic.

Fate
Alicia Hill, Sprent, master, was driven ashore and severely damaged on 25 November 1820 at Odessa. She had been lying in the Odessa Roads with a cargo of tallow and linseed, ready to sail to England, when a gale caused her to break her iron cable and drove her ashore. She was on a bed of mud and sand and was full of water. It was believed that she was badly damaged and she was being unloaded. The next report was that she had stranded on 7 December and that a heavy gale on the 22nd had broken her to pieces.

Citations

1807 ships
Ships built in France
Captured ships
Age of Sail merchant ships of England
Acts of piracy
Ships attacked and captured by pirates
Maritime incidents in November 1820